Harrison was a station on New Jersey Transit's Morris & Essex Lines (consisting of the Montclair Branch, Morristown Line and Gladstone Branch) in Harrison, New Jersey, United States. The station was built by the Delaware, Lackawanna and Western Railroad in 1906. It was situated between Newark Broad Street Station and Hoboken Terminal.

The station remained in service during most of the 20th century, until New Jersey Transit closed the station on September 16, 1984 with Roseville Avenue in Newark. The station was demolished  shortly afterwards.

See also
Harrison station (PATH)

References

Former NJ Transit stations
Former Delaware, Lackawanna and Western Railroad stations
Former railway stations in New Jersey
Demolished railway stations in the United States
Railway stations in the United States opened in 1906
Railway stations closed in 1984
1906 establishments in New Jersey
Harrison, New Jersey